Shin Hyung-min (born 18 July 1986) is a South Korean football player who plays for Ulsan Hyundai.

International career
His international career began when he played for the South Korea U-20 team.  On 18 January 2010, he made his first international cap for South Korea at the friendly match against Finland.

Club career statistics

Honors

Club
Pohang Steelers
Korean FA Cup (1): 2008
K-League Cup (1): 2009
AFC Champions League (1): 2009

Jeonbuk Hyundai Motors
K League 1 (1): 2017
AFC Champions League (1): 2016

References

External links
 
 FIFA Player Statistics
 

1986 births
Living people
Association football midfielders
South Korean footballers
South Korean expatriate footballers
South Korea under-20 international footballers
South Korea international footballers
Pohang Steelers players
Al Jazira Club players
Jeonbuk Hyundai Motors players
Ansan Mugunghwa FC players
Ulsan Hyundai FC players
K League 1 players
Expatriate footballers in the United Arab Emirates
South Korean expatriate sportspeople in the United Arab Emirates
UAE Pro League players